This is a list of present and upcoming anime on the Nippon TV network.

TV series (current)

TV series (all)

1960s—70s

1980s

1990s

2000s

2010s

2020s

Films and specials
Undersea Super Train: Marine Express (August 26, 1979)
Age of the Great Dinosaurs (October 7, 1979)
Bremen 4: Angels in Hell (August 23, 1981)
Andromeda Stories (August 22, 1982)
A Time Slip of 10000 Years: Prime Rose (August 21, 1983)
Bagi, the Monster of Mighty Nature (August 19, 1984)
The Prince of Devil Island: The Three-Eyed One (August 25, 1985)
Niji no Kanata e! Shōjo Diana-hi Monogatari (May 1, 1986)
Galaxy Investigation 2100: Border Planet (August 24, 1986)
Lupin III specials (since April 1, 1989)
The Tezuka Osamu Story: I Am Son-goku (August 27, 1989)
Time Patrol Bon (October 14, 1989)
Like the Clouds, Like the Wind (March 21, 1990)
Beyond the Tide of Time (June 16, 1991)
Zukkoke Sanningumi: Kusunoki Yashiki no Guruguru-sama (November 11, 1995)
City Hunter: The Secret Service (January 5, 1996)
Yawara! Special - Zutto Kimi no Koto ga... (July 19, 1996)
City Hunter: Goodbye My Sweetheart (April 25, 1997)
City Hunter: Death of the Vicious Criminal Ryo Saeba (April 23, 1999)

Nippon Television
Anime television
Nippon TV original programming